The , was one of four armored divisions of the Imperial Japanese Army in World War II.

History
The 4th Tank Division was raised on July 6, 1944 in Chiba, near Tokyo. It lacked both infantry and self-propelled gun regiments. Similar to the German Panzer-Lehr-Division, it was created out of the training departments of the Armor School, Cavalry School, Field Artillery School and Military Engineering School of the Imperial Japanese Army Academy, its remaining students and staff. Assigned to the IJA 36th Army Corps, it was designated for the defense of the Japanese home islands against the projected Allied invasion.

The 4th Tank Division was based in Fukuoka on Kyushu. It was equipped with the finest and most advanced armaments, including a "significant" number of Type 3 Chi-Nu medium tanks and Type 3 Ho-Ni III tank destroyers; these being available at its depot before the end of the war. Following Japan's surrender on Sept 3, 1945, the 4th Tank Division was officially demobilized with the rest of the Imperial Japanese Army, without having seen combat.

Commanding officer

Structure (1945)

The 4th Tank Division, after being relocated to Japan in 1945, consisted of a division headquarters, three tank regiments (roughly battalion-sized), one machine gun cannon battalion (anti-aircraft), one motor transport battalion, and one signal company.
Division Headquarters
28th Tank Regiment
29th Tank Regiment
30th Tank Regiment
Machine Gun Cannon Battalion (20mm AA)
Motor Transport Battalion
Signal Company

See also
 List of Japanese armored divisions

Notes

References

External links
Taki's Imperial Japanese Army Page - Akira Takizawa

Military units and formations established in 1944
Military units and formations disestablished in 1945
1944 establishments in Japan
1945 disestablishments in Japan
Tank Divisions of Japan